Avery Philips Paraiso (born September 22, 1994) is a Filipino-American commercial model and actor who is best known as one of the Top 14 finalists of the sixth season of StarStruck.

Before joining the reality show, Avery already appeared in several commercial shoots as a model. He considers his hair an advantage because aside from the fact that it is "low maintenance", it has won him roles in commercials before.

Early life and career beginnings

Paraiso was born in Honolulu, Hawaii, U.S.A. to an Irish mother and a Filipino father and but was raised in the Philippines since age three. Even at a young age, says Avery, he would always watch television and wonder what it would be like to be in front of the camera and be a household name.

He graduated from the Montessori Integrated School of Antipolo and is studying Mass Communication in La Salle Antipolo, has been working since he was 14. When he was 16, he got into commercials, and began acting at 17. He also won the Circle of 10 model search in 2009.

In 2013, Avery also appeared regularly in a variety show in PAGCOR, called Not Your Ordinary Variety Show. It is staged in different PAGCOR casinos around the country and features the Not Your Ordinary Boys and Girls members in specially-mounted production numbers where they get to show off their dancing and hosting skills. They also do some ramp modeling. His group, the Not Your Ordinary Boys and Girls is composed of six boys and two girls, including StarStruck season 5's Ian Batherson, took up various workshops under Direk Laurice Guillen, Mr. Pen Medina, Ms. Annie Quintos of The Company, G-Force and Mr. Boy Abunda. The group is managed by Backroom Incorporated. As defined in its official website, Backroom Inc. is "...one of the country’s most successful companies in artist booking and career management, public relations, promotions, multi-media publicity, and concert production."

In 2014, Avery also appeared in the film Once a Princess, in which Erich Gonzales plays the lead role. Avery has a featured minor role as a bully.

2015–present: StarStruck VI

Paraiso joins in Eew Stories on Carefree Pantiliners, After more than a five-year-long hiatus, GMA Network re-launched StarStruck for its sixth season. Upon learning that the age limit is set from 15 years old to 20 years old, Avery decided to join the reality show and said that no one pressured him to join. He vocally expresses his interest in joining StarStruck since then.

At the show's pilot episode, Avery was declared as part of the official line of semifinalists, emerging from Top 35 to top 28 contestants. He was joined by Koreen Medina and Klea Pineda in the episode.

In 2016, he joined the cast of the hit telefantasya, Encantadia as Kahlil, originally played by Jake Cuenca in Encantadia (2005).

Filmography

Television

Movies

See also
 StarStruck (Philippine TV series)
 StarStruck (season 6)

Notes

References

External links
Avery at StarStruck's official website
Avery's official Facebook fan page
Avery at Backroom Inc.'s official website

1994 births
Living people
Filipino male film actors
Star Magic
Filipino people of Irish descent
Filipino male television actors
GMA Network personalities
Male actors from Hawaii
StarStruck (Philippine TV series) participants
People from Antipolo
Male actors from Rizal